Lieutenant-Colonel Gorden Fraser VD was an acting Commander of the Ceylon Volunteers Force. He was appointed on 14 March 1913 until 13 May 1913.

References

Commanders of the Ceylon Defence Force